The Yang Family Ancestral Hall is an ancestral shrine in Jiadong Township, Pingtung County, Taiwan.

History
The shrine was built in 1923 with funds collected by members of the Yang family living in Pingtung.

Architecture
The building was constructed with traditional Hakka architecture style in quadrangle shape. It features a heart-shaped Tai chi pond located in front of the hall. The courtyard was built with red bricks. There are moon-shaped openings on the wall located on both sides of the courtyard. It is registered as the 3rd category historical site by the government.

Transportation
The shrine is accessible within walking north of Jiadong Station of Taiwan Railways.

See also
 Chinese ancestral veneration
 Chaolin Temple
 Donglong Temple
 Checheng Fuan Temple
 Three Mountains King Temple
 List of temples in Taiwan
 List of tourist attractions in Taiwan

References

1923 establishments in Taiwan
Ancestral shrines in Taiwan
Buildings and structures in Pingtung County